Mark David Budaska (born December 27, 1952) is an American former Major League Baseball outfielder and former hitting coach for the St. Louis Cardinals.

Early and personal life
Budaska was born on December 27, 1952, in Sharon, Pennsylvania.  He is an alumnus of Granada Hills (CA) High School. He was undrafted and was signed by the Oakland Athletics as an amateur free agent in 1973.

Career

Playing career
Budaska played five seasons at the Triple-A level, but just 13 games in the Major Leagues.  He played his final MLB game on August 18, 1981.

Coaching career
Prior to joining the Memphis coaching staff in 2008, Budaska spent the six years in the Boston Red Sox organization. He had four seasons (2004–2007) with Triple-A Pawtucket Red Sox in the International League. In 2002–2003, he was the hitting coach of the Double-A Portland Sea Dogs. In 2001, he helped the Anaheim Angels' Double-A affiliate Arkansas Travelers win the Texas League Championship, as the team ranked fourth in the league with a .266 team batting average. He also served as hitting coach and first base coach for a major league team in Taiwan from 1998 to 2000. He served as the assistant hitting coach with the St. Louis Cardinals for several weeks in the first half of the 2017 season while Bill Mueller was on personal leave. He then returned to their Triple-A Memphis Redbirds as hitting coach.

Budaska replaced John Mabry as hitting coach for the St. Louis Cardinals on July 15, 2018. The Cardinals hired Jeff Albert as their hitting coach after the 2018 season, and retained Budaska as assistant hitting coach. The Cardinals fired Budaska in August 2019, and replaced him with Jobel Jiménez.

References

External links
 or Retrosheet
Pura Pelota

1952 births
Living people
American expatriate baseball players in Canada
American expatriate baseball players in Japan
Baseball players from Pennsylvania
Burlington Bees players
Cardenales de Lara players
American expatriate baseball players in Venezuela
Chattanooga Lookouts players
LAPC Brahma Bulls baseball players
Lewiston Broncs players
Major League Baseball outfielders
Minor league baseball coaches
Modesto A's players
Oakland Athletics players
Ogden A's players
People from Sharon, Pennsylvania
San Jose Missions players
Tacoma Tigers players
Tigres de Aragua players
Vancouver Canadians players
Yokohama Taiyō Whales players
Baseball coaches from California
Granada Hills Charter High School alumni